Lampedusa is a genus of small, very elongate, air-breathing land snails, terrestrial pulmonate gastropod mollusks in the family Clausiliidae, the door snails, all of which have a clausilium.

Species
Species within the genus Lampedusa include:
 Lampedusa imitatrix
 Lampedusa melitensis

References

External links

 Nomenclator Zoologicus info

 
Taxa named by Oskar Boettger